Syed Mohammad Faisal is a Bangladesh Nationalist Party politician and a member of parliament for Habiganj-4.

Career
Faisal was elected to parliament from Habiganj-4 as an Bangladesh Nationalist Party candidate on 15 February 1996. He is the president of the Habiganj District unit of Bangladesh Nationalist Party.

References

Bangladesh Nationalist Party politicians
Date of birth missing (living people)
6th Jatiya Sangsad members